Roje pri Čatežu is a small settlement south of Čatež in the Municipality of Trebnje in Slovenia. The area is part of the traditional region of Lower Carniola and is now included in the Southeast Slovenia Statistical Region.

Name
The name of the settlement was changed from Roje to Roje pri Čatežu in 1953.

References

External links
Roje pri Čatežu at Geopedia

Populated places in the Municipality of Trebnje